Daniel Nijs (or Nys) (1572-1647) was a Flemish art dealer.

Life

Born in Wesel into a family of Protestant refugees from the Spanish Netherlands (now Belgium), he moved to Venice in 1596. There he worked for the firm of his cousins, the Gabrys, while also laying the foundation of his own firm. By 1615 he had made his fortune and possessed a major art collection which was described by Vincenzo Scamozzi, Giulio Cesare Gigli and Constantijn Huygens. In 1622 he came into contact with Ferdinando Gonzaga, Duke of Mantua to whom Nijs began supplying luxury goods. Five years later the 7th Duke, Vincenzo II Gonzaga, who was in dire financial straits, agreed to sell the cream of the paintings in the Gonzaga art collection to Nijs. Nijs, in turn, was interested in acquiring the paintings in order to sell them to Charles I of Great Britain. Its works included:
 La Perla, 1518-1520, by Giulio Romano, now in the Museo del Prado, Madrid
 Eleven Caesars, 1537-1539, by Titian, lost in a fire at the Alcázar near Madrid
 Madonna by Andrea del Sarto
 Saint Jerome by Giulio Romano
Vincenzo II's successor Charles I of Gonzaga-Nevers was persuaded to sell statues and further paintings to Nijs, leading to the bankruptcy of the dealer.  Among the works included in the second part of the sale are the Triumphs of Caesar now at Hampton Court. Nijs died in London in 1647.

References

Bibliography

External links

 yalebooks.co.uk

Flemish art dealers
People from Wesel
1542 births
1647 deaths